was king of the Ryukyu Kingdom from 1556 to 1572. He was called "Gen, the mute." The king required considerable support from the Sanshikan (Council of Three), the chief council of royal advisors. His reign marked the beginning of the council's demonstration of significantly greater effectiveness and efficiency than previously.

Shō Gen received his official investiture from the Ming Court in 1562, and received emissaries from the Shimazu clan of the Japanese province of Satsuma in 1570 and 1572. The Shimazu wished to establish some control over the Ryukyus, making them either a tributary or a vassal state. The kingdom resisted the Shimazu overtures, and a small punitive mission launched by the Shimazu created a small skirmish on the island of Amami Ōshima in 1571, although the Ryukyuans defeated them.

He was the second son of King Shō Sei, who he succeeded, and was succeeded in turn by his second son, Shō Ei.

See also 
 Imperial Chinese missions to the Ryukyu Kingdom

Notes

References
 Kerr, George H. (1965). Okinawa, the History of an Island People. Rutland, Vermont: C.E. Tuttle Co. OCLC  39242121
 Smits, Gregory. (1999). Visions of Ryukyu: Identity and Ideology in Early-Modern Thought and Politics, Honolulu: University of Hawaii Press. ; OCLC 39633631
 Suganuma, Unryu. (2000). Sovereign Rights and Territorial Space in Sino-Japanese Relations: Irredentism and the Diaoyu/Senkaku Islands. Honolulu: University of Hawaii Press. ; ;  OCLC 170955369

1528 births
1572 deaths
Second Shō dynasty
Kings of Ryūkyū
Mute people
Royalty and nobility with disabilities